Thomas Silver may refer to:

 Thomas Silver (musician), guitarist with Hardcore Superstar
 Thomas B. Silver (1947–2001), author, scholar and president of the Claremont Institute

See also
 Thomas Silvero (born 2000), Argentine footballer